The Italian Permanent Representative to the European Union is the official representative of the Government in Rome to the European Commission.

List of representatives

References 

 
European Union
Italy